The Texaco Cup was an all-Ireland association football competition that ran for two seasons in 1974 and 1975. The tournament was sponsored by American petroleum giant Texaco.

The competition had its origins in the original Texaco Cup which began in 1970 as a competition for English, Scottish, Northern Irish and Irish clubs that had not qualified for European competitions. Irish and Northern Irish clubs competed in 1970-71 and 1971-72 but then withdrew due to political pressure at the time. Texaco organised the Texaco (All-Ireland) Cup, a separate competition, for the Irish teams in 1973-74 and 1974-75.

Winners

See also 

 Texaco Cup

External links
 Irish Football Club Project Archive on All-Ireland Competitions
 Irish League Archive - Texaco (All-Ireland) Cup

References

Defunct all-Ireland association football cup competitions
1973–74 in Republic of Ireland association football
1974–75 in Republic of Ireland association football
1973–74 in Northern Ireland association football
1974–75 in Northern Ireland association football